Banzkow is a municipality in the Ludwigslust-Parchim district, in Mecklenburg-Vorpommern, Germany. Since 2009 it has included Goldenstädt.

From 1992 to 2009 Solveig Leo, who achieved celebrity status as the youngest LPG chairperson in East Germany, served as Mayor of Banzkow, representing the Party of Democratic Socialism and later The Left.

References

External links
 

Ludwigslust-Parchim